Gillian Rosemary Trumper (April 28, 1936 – October 11, 2019) was a Canadian politician, who represented the electoral district of Alberni-Qualicum in the Legislative Assembly of British Columbia from 2001 to 2005. She sat as a member of the BC Liberal Party. She previously served as Mayor of the City of Port Alberni from 1983 to 2001. She was the Union of BC Municipalities president and its Fisheries Committee chair, West Coast Treaty Advisory Committee chair, and Alberni-Clayoquot Regional District Board chair. She died at the age of 83 from complications of renal failure in 2019.

Electoral record

References

External links
 Profile at the Legislative Assembly of British Columbia

1936 births
2019 deaths
British Columbia Liberal Party MLAs
Women MLAs in British Columbia
21st-century Canadian politicians
21st-century Canadian women politicians
Politicians from London
People from Croydon
Canadian people of English descent